Cautín may refer to:

Cautín Province, a province in the Araucanía Region of southern Chile
Cautín River, a river in Chile that flows in Cautín Province